Characters with limb loss and limb difference are frequently found in many popular movies. In some cases they illustrate how individuals can thrive after limb loss.

References 

Fictional amputees